Soda Springs, California may refer to:

 Mendocino County:
Soda Springs (near Boonville), Mendocino County, California
Soda Springs (near Burbeck), Mendocino County, California
Tuolumne County:
 Soda Springs (Yosemite National Park)
 Soda Springs, Nevada County, California, a community near Donner Pass
 Soda Springs, Placer County, California, a former resort on the North Fork of the American River
 Soda Springs, former name of Zzyzx, California, in San Bernardino County